William Tuck may refer to:

William George Tuck (1900–1999), English watercolourist
William Hallam Tuck (1808–1884), Justice of the Maryland Court of Appeals
William Henry Tuck (1831–1913), Chief Justice of New Brunswick
William M. Tuck (1896–1983), Governor of Virginia